Harper is the name of several communities in the U.S. state of West Virginia.

Harper, Pendleton County, West Virginia
Harper, Raleigh County, West Virginia